Lufthansa operates a mainline fleet consisting of Airbus narrow and widebody and Boeing widebody aircraft. The mainline fleet is composed of eight different aircraft families: the Airbus A320ceo and A320neo families as well as the Airbus A330, Airbus A340, Airbus A350, Boeing 747 and Boeing 787 Dreamliner. Additionally, Lufthansa currently has orders placed for their A320neo family to replace their ageing A320-200 fleet. There are also orders for new Airbus A350s and Boeing 777Xs. The 777X will replace all Boeing 747-400s in the fleet. The 787s, together with the A350s, will replace all remaining Airbus A340 aircraft. The airline also announced the return of four A380 aircraft to service in 2023.

Current fleet 
, Lufthansa (excluding its subsidiaries Air Dolomiti, Eurowings, Eurowings Discover and Lufthansa CityLine) operates the following aircraft:

 Lufthansa announced the reactivation of three of its eight remaining A380s in 2023, further six have already been sold.

Historical fleet
Over the years, Lufthansa had operated a variety of aircraft since 1955, including:

See also
 Air France fleet
 British Airways fleet

References

External links
lufthansa.com - Lufthansa fleet

fleet
Lists of aircraft by operator